Craurococcus  is a Gram-negative and non-motile genus of bacteria from the family of Acetobacteraceae with one known species (Craurococcus roseus).

References

Further reading 
 
 

Rhodospirillales
Monotypic bacteria genera
Bacteria genera